Lisa Moorish (born 16 January 1972) is an English singer-songwriter. She had a solo career beginning in 1989, and was the lead singer of the indie band Kill City in the early 2000s.

Biography

Origins
Moorish was born in Walworth, but grew up in Brixton, South London. She is mixed race:  her father Henry Watt is a black Jamaican "mixed with Irish, Scottish, Asian", whilst her mother Iris is English and from Middlesbrough. They met in a Hammersmith club.

Music career
Moorish began her musical career in 1989, aged 17, when she signed to Jive Records. She released two singles with Jive, but they were not hits and she was dropped. In 1991 she released two singles with Polydor, but again commercial success eluded her. Signing to Go! Discs in the mid 1990s yielded an album (I've Gotta Have It All, 1996), as well as a collaboration with George Michael on a version of his Wham! hit "I'm Your Man", but neither achieved much success.

In 1995, Moorish performed backing vocals on an acoustic version of the Oasis song "Fade Away" for the Warchild charity album.

In 1996, Moorish provided backing vocals on Northern Irish indie band Ash's hit single, "Oh Yeah", which reached No. 6 in the UK Singles Chart.

In the early 2000s, Moorish was a member of indie band, Kill City. They were a four-piece consisting of Moorish, fellow songwriter "Welsh" Pete Jones on bass and guitarists Tom Bowen and Stuart Le Page. In 2004, they released their debut EP White Boys, Brown Girl on Alan McGee's Poptones label. Nash Gierak (Mower) joined the new line-up on bass in 2004–2006, alongside Tom Lindley and Pete Denton (The Kooks) on guitar.

In December 2003, Moorish recorded a cover of "Fairytale of New York" with Johnny Borrell on BBC Radio 6 Music. She has frequently performed with Drew McConnell. In 2006, Moorish appeared on the "Strummerville" charity single, a cover of The Clash's "Janie Jones" which peaked at No. 17 in the UK Singles Chart.

Solo discography
 "Just The Way It Is"
 "Mr Friday Night"
 "I'm Your Man"
 "Love For Life"

Children
On 26 March 1998, Moorish gave birth to a daughter Molly, who was fathered by Liam Gallagher and conceived two months after Gallagher married Patsy Kensit. In 2003, she gave birth to a son named Astile to The Libertines front man, Pete Doherty.

References

External links
 Lisa Moorish discography at Discogs.com

1972 births
Living people
English people of Jamaican descent
English people of Irish descent
English people of Indian descent
English songwriters
Women rock singers
21st-century English women singers
21st-century English singers